Boherlahan is a small village and census town in County Tipperary, Ireland. It lies on the R660 regional road between Cashel and Holycross. Boherlahan was designated as a census town by the Central Statistics Office for the first time in the 2016 census, at which time it had a population of 299 people.

Charles Bianconi (1786–1875), entrepreneur and developer of coach services in Ireland, lived at Longfield House near Boherlahan, and commissioned an Italianate-style memorial chapel in the village cemetery. The local Roman Catholic church, alongside the cemetery, was built in 1964 on the site of an earlier 19th century church.

The national (primary) school in the village, Saint Isidore's National School, had an enrollment of approximately 100 pupils as of 2017.

The local Gaelic Athletic Association club is Boherlahan–Dualla GAA.

References

Towns and villages in County Tipperary